Bill Binney may refer to:

 William Binney (U.S. intelligence official) (born 1943)
 Bill Binney (ice hockey) (1897–1967), Canadian ice hockey player